Ernst Plassmann (14 June 1823 – 28 November 1877; alternate spelling, Plassman) was a German-American sculptor and carver.

Biography
Born in Sondern, near Wuppertal, North Rhine-Westphalia, Plassmann began to study art under Munstermann, then continued his studies in Aachen, Cologne, and finally in Paris, where he spent about four years in the studio of Michel Liénard. He moved to New York City in 1853, and in 1854 established "Plassmann's School of Art", which he ran the rest of his life. In 1858 he founded the "Verein fur Kunst und Wissenschaft" (Association for Art and Science). In New York he became known for his statue of Benjamin Franklin (1870–1) in Printing House Square, depicted as a printer by including an issue of the Pennsylvania Gazette in his left hand. Plassmann spent months researching Franklin busts, portraits, and costumes, and he "labored conscientiously for several months" on the "colossal" clay statue, which was inaugurated on 17 January 1872.

His figures of Franklin and Guttenberg are located on the New Yorker Staats-Zeitung building (c.1873). The heroic statue of Chief Tammany, a legendary Delaware Indian chief, was part of the façade of Tammany Hall on 14th Street (1868/9), while the 1869  bronze statue of Cornelius Vanderbilt, the Commodore Vanderbilt, is located at the south façade of Midtown Manhattan's Grand Central Terminal. A Plassmann sculpture stands in the freight depot of the New York Central Railroad (1870), aside from various metal works, including medals. In 1875, he published Modern Gothic Ornaments with 83 plates. He began publishing Designs for Furniture in 1877, and had completed three parts by the time of his death (in New York City).

Selected works 
 (1875) A collection of modern Gothic ornaments for architects, sculptors, modelers, designers, painters, &c., &c. 
 (1877) Designs for furnitures and development,

References

Further reading 
 McCormick, Heather Jane (1998), Ernst Plassmann, 1822–1877: A New York Carver, Sculptor, Designer and Teacher
 A bust of Plassmann was sculpted by US artist Caspar Buberl (1834–1899).

German sculptors
German male sculptors
19th-century American sculptors
19th-century American male artists
American male sculptors
Artists from New York City
1823 births
1877 deaths
German emigrants to the United States
People from Olpe (district)
American architectural sculptors
Sculptors from New York (state)